Ethiopian (from Greek Αἰθίοπας "having a burnt face", also Latinized Ethiopia in historical contexts) may also refer to: 

pertaining to the state of Ethiopia
Ethiopian Airlines, the national airline of Ethiopia  
a person from Ethiopia, or of Ethiopian descent
see people of Ethiopia
the demographics of Ethiopia
for individuals, see List of Ethiopians
also Ethiopic, the Ethiopian Semitic languages
more specifically, the Ge'ez language

Obsolete usage
Historically, Aethiopian was also:
 a term referring to Sub-Saharan Africa, e.g:
the Ethiopian Ocean, an obsolete name for the South Atlantic
the Ethiopian movement
a historical term for black African, especially in North America, e.g.:
the Ethiopian Serenaders
Ethiopian Regiment, a regiment of Black Loyalists during the American Revolution
Peace Movement of Ethiopia
Washing the Ethiopian White, a fable
Dysaesthesia aethiopica, a pseudoscientific diagnosis purported to afflict black slaves in the US

See also
Ethiopian race (disambiguation)
Sudan (region)

Language and nationality disambiguation pages